The Rural Municipality of Lawrence is a former rural municipality (RM) in the Canadian province of Manitoba. It was originally incorporated as a rural municipality on November 5, 1914. It ceased on January 1, 2015 as a result of its provincially mandated amalgamation with the RM of Ochre River to form the Rural Municipality of Lakeshore.

The former RM is located on the northeast shore of Dauphin Lake.

Communities 
 East Bay
 Freedale
 Magnet
 Million
 Moose Bay
 Rorketon
 Toutes Aides
 Weiden

References

External links 
 
 Map of Lawrence R.M. at Statcan

Lawrence
Populated places disestablished in 2015
2015 disestablishments in Manitoba